Oruza rupestre is a species of moth of the family Erebidae. It is found in Seychelles.

See also
List of moths of the Seychelles

References
Fryer, J. C. F. 1912. The Lepidoptera of Seychelles and Aldabra, exclusive of the Orneodidae and Pterophoridae and of the Tortricina and Tineina. - Transactions of the Linnean Society of London (2)15(Zool.)(1):1–28; pl. 1

External links

Boletobiinae
Moths described in 1912